Xenocytaea victoriensis is a jumping spider species in the genus Xenocytaea. It was first identified in 2011 by Barbara Maria Patoleta.

Description
The species has a brown cephalothorax with white scales.

Distribution
Xenocytaea victoriensis is found in Fiji.

References

Spiders of Fiji
Salticidae
Spiders described in 2011